Oh, Ramona! is a 2019 Romanian coming-of-age comedy film directed by Cristina Jacob, based on the novel Suck It, Ramona! by Romanian comedian Andrei Ciobanu. The film was released in Romania on 14 February 2019 by Jacob Bros and on Netflix on 1 June 2019. Oh, Ramona! is the first Romanian film distributed worldwide on Netflix in 190 territories, dubbed in 27 languages and translated in 33 languages. During the 8 weeks of theatrical distribution, Oh, Ramona! recorded a total of 256.115 admissions, with 30,243 tickets sold on the first day and reached about 111.881 admissions after the first weekend of release.."Oh, Ramona! is a film about the new generation of teenagers… mentalities, behaviours and all the change in the context of globalisation. Even the new vocabulary shows us the strength of this phenomenon. I may or may not agree, but I have to show this in a film, which is about teenagers in the current age", said Cristina Jacob.

Plot
Oh, Ramona! follows the main character Andrei from his point of view while he steps into adulthood and dealing with romance. He shares his experience as seen through the eyes of a teenager, with all the good and bad parts of it, and a pinch of self-humour and irony. The film portrays Andrei, who is in love with two girls and tormented by the decisions he has to make. Andrei has a crush on the "hottest girl in school", Ramona, who tries to hook up with him. Andrei rejects her in a moment of confusion, which starts a whole series of unfortunate events. Later on another girl Andrei meets on a vacation, Anemona, is charmed by his sincerity and dorkiness and he ends up being torn between the two girls he 'loves'.

Cast
 Aggy K. Adams	as Ramona
 Holly Horne as Anemona
 Bogdan Iancu as Andrei
 Adina Stetcu as Raluca
 Basil Eidenbenz as Alin
 Mihaela Mihut	as Psychologist
 Leonardo Boudreau as Silviu
 Andromeda Godfrey as Alfred (Andrei's Mother)
 Melanie Ebanks as Carla
 Ioachim Ciobanu as The Priest
 Howard Dell as Bodyguard
 Andrei Ciobanu as Bartender Hotel
 Cristina Ich as Girl in Alin's flat

Writing

Oh, Ramona! is based on the Romanian best-selling book Suck it, Ramona!, which is Andrei Ciobanu’s autobiography. The process of writing the screenplay took 6 months and it was co-written with Alex Coteț and Cristina Jacob.

Andrei Ciobanu pointed out about his first attempt at writing the story: "On September 26 2013 I was writing a story on Facebook about a girl I liked in high school. That post was going to be the first chapter of the book I was going to write. I published it on February 14, 2015 and it soon became a bestseller in Romania.’’
During the summer of 2016, Andrei Ciobanu received an offer from Cristina Jacob to screen the story: "We wrote the script, we cut it, erased it, rewrote it, we got annoyed, we looked for actors, we filmed and then we kissed for two years and finally the thing came out", said the comedian.

Casting

A series of castings were conducted internationally and throughout Romania for several months. For the main character, there were considered actors from the United States, Great Britain and Romania (Iasi, Bucharest and Cluj). The role of Andrei was given to Bogdan Iancu, a young upcoming actor from Bucharest.

Cristina Jacob declared that she auditioned about 10.000 actors for each character. Aggy K. Adams, a Polish-born actress who grew up in the United States and settled in London was chosen for the role of Ramona. For the role of Anemona, Holly Horne from the United Kingdom was chosen for the part. Cristina Jacob, selected an international cast: Bogdan Iancu, Aggy K. Adams, Holly Horne, Basil Eidenbenz, Leonardo Boudreau, Andromeda Godfrey, Melanie Ebanks, along with guests stars such as Smiley, Feli, Andrei Ciobanu, Cristina Ich, Laura Giurcanu, Gina Pistol, Gabriel Jugaru and Howard Dell.

Filming
 
From development to shooting, Oh, Ramona! production was a process of three and a half years with 35 days of filming. The shoot started in the summer of 2017 and finished at the end of September. .To avoid an explicit content, the director chose a variety of visual comparisons, particularly along the erotic discoveries of Andrei, that are doubled by images of exciting desserts.

Music

The soundtrack of the film was created by HaHaHa Production. Among the creators is Smiley (Andrei Tiberiu Maria), a famous Romanian pop singer. The recording was coordinated by Cristina Jacob. During one of his interviews Smiley mentioned that “The music in the movie has not much to do with what is happening in Romania, musically speaking. This is the big advantage when you work for something like that, as you have a lot of freedom. We really like this story and the music in the movie, because it is a different challenge". Șerban Cazan, music producer at HaHaHa Production, pointed out that it was a surprise to see the final version of the film and the music they created: “we liked the music so much that I thought we should do a compilation ", said Cazan.

Reception

Oh, Ramona! occupied the first position in the weekly Box Office of 2019. The film had a budget over 2.5 m EUR, which was partially covered by the Romanian Film Centre. The producers of the film are Adrian Sârbu and Daniel Jacob.

References

External links
 
 

2019 comedy films
2019 films
2010s coming-of-age comedy films
2010s sex comedy films
2010s teen comedy films
English-language Romanian films
Films based on Romanian novels
Romanian comedy films
Teen sex comedy films
2010s English-language films
Films directed by Cristina Jacob